Kelston was a small railway station about four miles west of Bath on the Midland Railway's Mangotsfield and Bath Branch Line.

History

Kelston Station was opened in 1869 when the Midland Railway opened its Mangotsfield to Bath branchline. The station was located a short distance across some fields from the village of Kelston and closer to the village of Saltford on the other side of the River Avon, which it was connected to by a footpath that ran alongside the railway on the bridge over the river. For many years the station was known as "Kelston (for Saltford)", although Saltford had its own station on the Great Western Main Line. 
The station generated little traffic apart from race days at Bath Racecourse, which could be reached by a three-mile trek over the fields, mostly uphill, or regatta days at Saltford. 
The station closed at the end of 1948, although the line remained open for passenger traffic until March 1966 and for goods to Bath Gasworks until 1971.

The station was destroyed by fire in 1882.

Services

Future
The Avon Valley Railway plans to reopen Kelston station as part of their southern extension to Bath.

References

 Somerset Railway stations by Mike Oakley, Dovecote Press, Wimborne, 2002.

Disused railway stations in Bath, Somerset
Former Midland Railway stations
Railway stations in Great Britain opened in 1869
Railway stations in Great Britain closed in 1949
History of Bath, Somerset
1869 establishments in England